Cynthia Friend is president and chief operating officer of The Kavli Foundation.  She is on leave from the Department of Chemistry and Chemical Biology at Harvard University.  Friend was the first female full professor of Chemistry at Harvard, attaining the position in 1989. Friend has held the Theodore William Richards Chiar in Chemistry and served as Professor of Materials Science in the Paulson School of Engineering. She is a member of the National Academy of Sciences, the American Academy of Arts and Sciences and a fellow of the American Association of Arts and Sciences and the American Chemical Society. Her research has focused on nano-science applied to sustainability.  Friend and her group have investigated the chemical and physical properties of interfaces, by investigating important catalytic reactions and by making new materials with key chemical functionality. Her lab aims to develop solutions to important problems in energy usage and environmental chemistry.

Friend joined the Chemistry department of Harvard University in 1982 after doing her postdoctoral research at Stanford University and earning her Ph.D. from the University of California, Berkeley. Her previous leadership positions at Harvard include Associate Dean of the Faculty of Arts and Sciences (2002–05), Chair of the Department of Chemistry and Chemical Biology (2004–07), and Associate Director of the Materials Research Science and Engineering Center (2002-2011), and Radcliffe Trustee (1990–93). Dr. Friend also served as Associate Director of the Department of Energy's SLAC National Accelerator Laboratory, at Stanford University (2011-2012) while on a leave from Harvard. She is currently the Chair of a Federal Advisory Committee, Basic Energy Sciences Advisory Committee (BESAC), on which she has served since 2018.

Friend has also served the community through various advisory roles.  She was previously a Senior Editor of Accounts of Chemical Research, a journal of the American Chemical Society.  She was also a member of the editorial board of ACS Catalysis, Chemical Science, and the Journal of the American Chemical Society and was co-Editor-in-Chief of the Catalysis Science & Technology journal from 2010 until 2013.

Besides here scholarly work, Dr. Friend is a member of the board of directors of Bruker Instruments (BRKR).

Early years 
Cynthia Friend was born in the village of Lawrence, Nebraska, where her father was also born.  Lawrence was a predominantly German-Catholic village where her grandfather settled as a young adult. Friend has one brother, Randolph.  Her parents were both veterans of WWII.  Elise was a staff sergeant in the US Marine Corps and Matt, her father, was a bomber pilot in the Army Air Corps.

Matt and his brother ran a plumbing and heating company that serviced the community in vicinity of Lawrence. In 1960, her family moved to nearby Hastings Nebraska because the business could not support two families.  Her mother worked as a bookkeeper in Hastings and her father worked for a plumbing and heating supply company.

Friend attended Catholic school in Hastings through the sixth grade and thereafter transferred to the public school system.  In high school, she benefited from a flexible educational schedule that allowed her to take independent study courses under the supervision of several dedicated teachers.  She was also a lab assistant for the chemistry and biology teachers, which helped her build on her interest in science.

Cynthia learned to play golf early on from her father and played competitively, mainly at the local and state levels.  Friend gave up golf after high school in order to attend college.  At that time, there were no athletic opportunities for women.  She renewed her interest in golf as an adult and competed at local, state, and national levels.

Education
Friend enrolled at University of California, Davis, after having graduated from Hastings High School in 1973.  She earned her B.S. degree in Chemistry in 1977.  At the University of California, Berkeley, Friend studied Physical Chemistry under the direction of Prof. Earl Muetterties.  She completed her Ph.D. in 1981 and subsequently was a postdoctoral researcher for one year at Stanford University in the Department of Chemical Engineering in the Madix Group.

Harvard 
Cynthia Friend began her independent research career as an Assistant Professor of Chemistry at Harvard University in 1982.  She moved through the ranks to become the first female Full Professor of Chemistry in 1989.  Friend was appointed as the Theodore William Richards Professor of Chemistry in 1998 and as Professor of Materials Science in the School of Engineering and Applied Sciences at Harvard in 2002.    Prof. Friend has served in many leadership roles at Harvard, including as the first and only Department Chair in Chemistry (2004–07), as Associate Dean of the Faculty of Arts and Sciences (FAS) (2002–05), and as Director of the Rowland Institute (2013–19).  Friend served on numerous committees and played significant roles in changing policies and practices in the university community. As Associate Dean, she revised the processes for tenure and promotion of faculty FAS that had a profound influence on opportunities for

Kavli Foundation 
The Kavli Foundation selected Dr. Cynthia M. Friend, Theodore Williams Richards Professor of Chemistry at Harvard University, as its president. Dr. Friend took a leave Harvard and assumed this post on January 1, 2021.

Awards

IBM Faculty Development Award, 1983‑1985
Presidential Young Investigator Award, 1985-1990
Union Carbide Innovation Recognition Program, 1988‑89
Distinguished Young Alumni Award, University of California, Davis, 1990
Agnes Fay Morgan Research Award Recipient, 1991
American Chemical Society Garvan Medal, 1991
Elected to Iota Chapter, Phi Beta Kappa, Radcliffe College, 1992
Langmuir Lecturer, Colloid Division of the American Chemical Society, 1995
Alexander von Humboldt Senior Research Fellowship, 2007
Hanse-Wissenschaftskolleg Fellowship, 2008
Fellow, American Association of Arts and Sciences, 2009
American Chemical Society, George C. Olah Award in Hydrocarbon Chemistry, 2009
Fellow, American Chemical Society, 2010
Bowdoin College Honorary Doctorate in Science, 2011 
American Chemical Society Award in Surface Chemistry, 2017
 Elected to American Academy of Arts and Sciences, 2018
Elected to the National Academy of Sciences, 2019

References

External links
 Friend Group at Harvard

21st-century American chemists
Harvard University faculty
University of California, Davis alumni
University of California, Berkeley alumni
Living people
American women chemists
Year of birth missing (living people)
Members of the United States National Academy of Sciences
Fellows of the American Academy of Arts and Sciences
American women academics
21st-century American women scientists